Forte de Santo Inácio is a fort located in Tamandaré, Pernambuco in Brazil. The fort was restored in 2015.

See also
History of Pernambuco

References

External links

Santo Inacio
Buildings and structures in Pernambuco
Portuguese colonial architecture in Brazil